is a Japanese women's professional shogi player ranked 2-dan. She holds the record for being the youngest person at age 11 years 6 months to have ever been awarded women's professional status by the Japan Shogi Association.

Early life
Fujita was born on March 24, 1987, in Ōta, Tokyo. She learned how to play shogi from her father as a young girl, but started to become really serious about the game as a second-grade elementary school student. Her father was fairly strict so she was not allowed to watch much television as a child, with the exception being when her family watched the recorded games from the NHK Cup TV Shogi Tournament together weekly. Most of her shogi studying involved solving tsume shogi problems and playing over professional game scores found in Japan Shogi Association (JSA) yearbooks and magazines, but occasionally she would go to play practice games at the shogi club located in the association's Tokyo head office.

Fujita entered the JSA's Women's Professional Apprentice League as a student of shogi professional  in April 1997 and finished second in the league's Class B division for the AprilSeptember 1997 season with a record of 14 wins and 4 losses to earn promotion to the Class A division. Fujita finished her first season in Class A (October 1997March 1998) with a record of 7 wins and 9 losses, but obtained women's professional status and promotion to the rank of women's professional 2-kyū after finishing first with a record of 12 wins a 2 losses in the league's Class A division for the  AprilSeptember 1998 season. Fujita was 11 years 6 months old when she was promoted which made her the youngest person to ever be awarded women's professional status.

Promotion history
Fujita has been promoted as follows:
 2-kyū: October 1, 1998
 1-kyū: April 1, 2000
 1-dan: April 1, 2001
 2-dan: August 13, 2016

Note: All ranks are women's professional ranks.

Notes

References

External links
 ShogiHub: Professional Player Info · Fujita, Aya
 

Japanese shogi players
Living people
Women's professional shogi players

Professional shogi players from Tokyo
People from Ōta, Tokyo
1987 births